The George Harper Store is a historic crossroads general store located in Still Pond, Kent County, Maryland, united States. It is a late 19th-century five-bay frame commercial structure, two stories high with a central entrance and gable roof.  Attached to it is a series of later additions, believed to date from about the turn of the 20th century. It operated as a store from 1894 to 1959.

The George Harper Store was listed on the National Register of Historic Places in 1982.

References

External links
, including photo from 1980, at Maryland Historical Trust

Buildings and structures in Kent County, Maryland
Commercial buildings on the National Register of Historic Places in Maryland
Commercial buildings completed in 1877
Historic American Buildings Survey in Maryland
National Register of Historic Places in Kent County, Maryland
1877 establishments in Maryland